Eastville may refer to:

Australia
Eastville, Victoria, Shire of Loddon, Victoria, Australia

Canada
Eastville, Nova Scotia, Canada

United Kingdom
Eastville, Bristol, England
Eastville Stadium, the former home of Bristol Rovers FC
Eastville, Lincolnshire, England

United States
Eastville, Georgia, USA
Eastville, Virginia, USA